The 1909 All-Ireland Senior Football Championship was the 23rd staging of Ireland's premier Gaelic football knock-out competition. In the Leinster semi-final Louth ended Dublin's period as All Ireland champions. Kerry were the winners.

Results

Connacht Senior Football Championship

Leinster Senior Football Championship

Munster Senior Football Championship

Ulster Senior Football Championship

All-Ireland Senior Football Championship

Championship statistics

Miscellaneous
 1909 was the GAA's 25th anniversary.

References

All-Ireland Senior Football Championship